Evelina Papoulia (Greek: Εβελίνα Παπούλια; born 25 March 1971) is a Greek actress and dancer. She is best known for her role as Marina Kountouratou in the TV series Dyo Xenoi (1997).

Career
In 1989 she moved to New York City to study dance at The Martha Graham School of Contemporary Dance and acting at The Lee Strasberg Theater Institute. During her time in New York City, she took part in several plays, such as "West Side Story" (1993), while participating in the Mega Dance Company. Originally she wanted to obtain the American citizenship, but failing to do so she returned to Athens in 1993 and continued working as an actress. Evelina first claimed stardom as the hysterical blond TV persona Marina Kountouratou, who fell in love with a man of classic education, in "Dyo Xenoi" in 1997.

Her film debut was in the successful Greek film "Safe Sex" in 1999.

While working on TV shows, she continued her career on stage with plays such as "Waiting Till Dark" (1999) and the rock musical Hedwig and the Angry Inch.

From 2006 until 2008, she was a judge at the Greek version of "So You Think You Can Dance".

Personal life

Papoulia has a daughter named Afroditi-Maria, from her first marriage to George Liandos. In May 2008, she married director Panagiotis Kravvas in Scotland and got divorced in 2008.

This article incorporates text from the corresponding article in the Greek Wikipedia.

Filmography

Television

References

External links

1971 births
Living people
Greek stage actresses
Greek female dancers